Paul Standidge (born 1 April 1934) is a New Zealand cricketer. He played in four first-class matches for Wellington in 1957/58.

See also
 List of Wellington representative cricketers

References

External links
 

1934 births
Living people
New Zealand cricketers
Wellington cricketers
Cricketers from Wellington City